Danny Baranowsky (born April 5, 1984), also known as Danny B or by the company name dB Soundworks, is an American electronic music composer, composing music mainly for indie films and indie games. He founded dB Soundworks to sell and promote his music. He is most known for providing the music for games such as Canabalt, Super Meat Boy, The Binding of Isaac, and Crypt of the NecroDancer. Baranowsky has also contributed to the soundtrack of the 2016 Amplitude remake.

Career
Baranowsky first came into contact with video game music in 2001, when he became a member of online game remix community OverClocked ReMix. At this time, Baranowsky was hoping to become a film composer.

When Adam Saltsman, who would later develop Canabalt, sent Baranowsky an incomplete version of Gravity Hook, which Saltsman intended to keep free of music, Baranowsky decided to write a track for it anyway. When Baranowsky sent "Track A" back to Saltsman, he was really impressed by the music. After finishing the soundtrack of Gravity Hook, Saltsman introduced Baranowsky to Edmund McMillen, for whom he later composed the soundtrack of Super Meat Boy and The Binding of Isaac.

He co-composed Desktop Dungeons with Grant Kirkhope and composed the entirety of the Crypt of the Necrodancer soundtrack.

Baranowsky moved from his native Arizona to Vancouver, British Columbia to work for independent developer Brace Yourself Games, composing the soundtracks of their games Industries of Titan and Cadence of Hyrule.

Reception
Rory Young from Game Rant described Baranowsky as "amazingly talented" because of his work on Super Meat Boy.

Discography

Albums

Soundtracks

References

External links
 dB Soundworks home page
 Bandcamp page
 IMDb page
 VGMdb page

1984 births
American electronic musicians
American male composers
Living people
Video game composers